Severn Trent Water Authority  was one of ten regional water authorities established in 1974. Its area of operation was the catchments of the River Trent and River Severn. It assumed the powers and responsibilities of existing water supply authorities in those catchment areas, the Severn River Authority, the Trent River Authority and the sewage and sewage disposal responsibilities of the councils within its area.

It took its name from the two major rivers in this area, the Severn and the Trent.

In July 1989, the authority was partly privatised under the Water Act 1989, together with most of the rest of the water supply and sewage disposal industry in England and Wales, to form Severn Trent Water, with a responsibility to supply freshwater and treat sewage for around 8 million people living in the Midlands of England and also a small area of Wales. The remaining regulatory and control functions such as pollution control, flood prevention and water resource management were subsumed into the newly formed National Rivers Authority.

Statutory water undertakers acquired 
It took over the following public-sector statutory water undertakers:
Birmingham Corporation Water Department
the water supply department of Coventry Corporation
the water supply department of Leicester Corporation
City of Nottingham Water Department
the water supply department of Stafford Corporation
the water supply department of Wolverhampton Corporation
the water supply department of Cannock Rural District Council
Central Nottinghamshire Water Board
East Shropshire Water Board
Montgomeryshire Water Board
North Derbyshire Water Board
North East Warwickshire Water Board
North West Gloucestershire Water Board
North West Leicestershire Water Board
North West Worcestershire Water Board
Rugby Joint Water Board
South Derbyshire Water Board
South Warwickshire Water Board
South West Worcestershire Water Board
Staffordshire Potteries Water Board
West Shropshire Water Board

Section 12 of the Water Act 1973 stated that “where the area of a water authority includes the whole or part of the limits of supply of a statutory water company, the authority shall discharge their duties with respect to the supply of water within those limits through the company.” The following two private statutory water companies continued to supply water as before within their limits as supply but only as "agents" of the water authority:
East Worcestershire Waterworks Company – from 1 September 1993, the water undertaking of this company was transferred to Severn Trent as per The East Worcester and Severn Trent Water (Amendment of Local Enactments etc.) Order 1993 (S.I. 1993 No. 2130)
South Staffordshire Waterworks Company 
The water authority remained responsible for sewerage and sewage disposal within the limits of supply of these two companies.

Other organisations and functions acquired 
The water authority took over the following public-sector bulk water suppliers:
Derwent Valley Water Board
River Dove Water Board
It took over the following main drainage authorities, which were joint boards set up to deal with the main sewerage and sewage treatment in their respective areas:
Upper Tame Main Drainage Authority
Upper Stour Main Drainage Authority

It took over two river authorities, responsible for control of water pollution, water resource management and flood prevention:
 Trent River Authority
 Severn Trent River Authority

The authority also took over the functions responsible for sewerage and sewage disposal from all local authorities, including main drainage authorities, within its area; however, section 15 of the Water Act 1973 allowed district (but not county) councils to enter into agency agreements with water authorities whereby the district councils became their "agents" for the maintenance and design and construction of new sewers.

Reservoirs
The company abstracted water from a number of reservoirs. These included:
Carsington Reservoir – River Derwent compensation flow pumped storage facility
Upper Derwent Valley (Derwent, Howden and Ladybower Reservoirs) – Built by the Derwent Valley Water Board to supply the cities of Sheffield, Derby, Nottingham and Leicester
Draycote Water
Foremark Reservoir
Shustoke Reservoir
Tittesworth reservoir
Ogston Reservoir, in the Amber Valley
Linacre Reservoirs (non operational since 1995)
It  also operated the filtration works at the Elan Valley Reservoirs

It also had abstraction licences for river abstractions which included operating rules linked to storage at both Clywedog reservoir and Lake Vyrnwy although no water from those reservoirs was directly piped to supply.

See also
 Regional water authority

References

Renewable resource companies established in 1974
Water companies of England
Water supply in Birmingham, West Midlands